Escaramuza charra is the only female equestrian event in the Mexican charrería. The escaramuza means "skirmish" and consists of a team riding horses in choreographed synchronized maneuvers to music. The women ride side-saddle and wear traditional Mexican outfit that include sombreros, dresses, and matching accessories. A team consists of 16 women, but only 8 ride at a time. The routine is practiced in a lienzo, or a circular arena.

The escaramuza season runs from February to November. The U.S. nationals are held on Labor Day weekend, while the grand finales are held in Mexico that brings together over 80 teams from both sides of the border.

History 
The sport was inspired "by the Mexican adelitas, who fought in the Mexican Revolution."  Although charrería is Mexico's national sport, there are charro and escaramuza teams in the United States and Canada.

Typically, rodeo families pass the charro tradition on from father to son, but also have started getting women involved.

See also 

 Escaramuza: Riding from the Heart film (2012) http://www.ponyhighway.com/emz.html

References 

Equestrian sports
Mexican culture
Rodeo in Mexico
Women in sports
Women's sport in Mexico
Women's sports
Mexican-American culture